Mimeryssamena besucheti is a species of beetle in the family Cerambycidae, and the only species in the genus Mimeryssamena. It was described by Breuning in 1971.

References

Acanthocinini
Beetles described in 1971
Monotypic beetle genera